Pai Chai University is one of South Korea's oldest modern universities. Its campus is located in Seo-gu, in Daejeon metropolitan city, on the lower slopes of Yeonja Mountain.  It has a present-day student body of about 14,000. Undergraduate programs are administered by the Colleges of Humanities, Foreign Studies, Business Administration, Social Sciences, Tourism Management, Natural Sciences, Engineering, Performing Inter-media Arts and Fine Arts.  Numerous graduate programs in these fields are provided as well.

History
The school was founded by the missionary Henry Appenzeller in 1885, not long after the Joseon government had legalized Christianity and reformed the national educational system. At that time it was known as Baejae Hakdang (배재학당), which might be rendered as "Pai Chai Academy."  It was officially established as a college in 1895.

Symbols 
The tiger is an animal that appears many times in the legend and fables of Korea, and it has both intimacy and courage. Tiger, a symbol of disembowelment, symbolizes intimacy, ambition, and bravery based on the personality and scholarship of disloyal people.

Ginkgo has been widely distributed on the earth since 150 million years ago and is very strong in cold and wind. The ginkgo tree is a symbol of exuberant tradition and prosperity of the future.

Yulan is a flower that endures the cold of winter and blooms in early spring in the spring, and is loved by many people. Symbolizing the disloyalty, Yulan is a flower that indirectly submits the sublime spirit and purity of the evicted people.

Colleges
Pai Chai University has 6 colleges. 
 College of Humanities and Social Sciences
 College of business school
 College of Life and Health
 College of AI/SW Creative Convergence
 College of Arts and Culture
 College of Ju Si Kyung (Liberal Arts)

Graduate schools
Graduate Programs
Graduate School of Information and Communications
Graduate School of International Business and Commerce
Graduate School of Law
Graduate School of Tourism Management
Graduate School of Public Administration

See also
List of colleges and universities in South Korea
Education in South Korea

External links
Pai Chai University's website
Pai Chai University's fingerprint attendance system website
Pai Chai University's Electronic Engineering Department
Pai Chai University's English-language website
Pai Chai University's Japanese-language website
Pai Chai University's Chinese-language website
Pai Chai University's Vietnamese-language website
 Pai Chai University's Civil,Environmental & Railroad Engineering website
Pai Chai University's Education Center for Korean as a Foreign Language website
Vietnamese Student Association in Pai Chai University or Vietnamese Student Association in Pai Chai University

Universities and colleges in Daejeon
Educational institutions established in 1885
1885 establishments in Korea